Mannequin is a 1926 American silent romantic drama film produced by Famous Players-Lasky and distributed by Paramount Pictures. James Cruze directed and Alice Joyce, Warner Baxter, and Dolores Costello were the stars. The film is still extant.

Plot
As described in a film magazine review, Selene Herrick's weakness for "things" she purchases at auctions brings about a quarrel with her husband John in 1907. He has hired a nurse, Annie Pogani, who runs off with the Herrick baby, Joan. John is under the impression that the child was taken away by Selene. The wife eventually returns and the loss of their child is disclosed. Raised in the East Side of New York City, after Annie's death Joan eventually obtains work as a cloak model and is eventually found by her parents.

Cast

Production
The novel that the film was based upon written by Fannie Hurst won a $50,000 contest conducted by Liberty in connection with Paramount Pictures, and was serialized by the magazine in 1926 when the film was released. Theater operators were encouraged to reference the magazine and prize when advertising the film.

References

External links

 
 
 
 
 Film poster (Wayback Machine)
 Lantern slide plate advert, coming attractions

1926 films
American silent feature films
Films directed by James Cruze
Famous Players-Lasky films
1920s romance films
American black-and-white films
American romance films
Films based on works by Fannie Hurst
1920s American films